Helix is a genus of large, air-breathing land snails native to Europe and the Mediterranean region. They are the type genus of the family Helicidae, and are among the first animal genera described by Carl Linnaeus. Members of the genus first appeared during the Oligocene. Like most land snails, Helix species are hermaphroditic, and like other helicids, a courting pair will impale each other with hormone-rich love darts prior to exchanging sperm. Well-known species include Helix pomatia (Roman snail, Burgundy snail, or edible snail) and Helix lucorum (Turkish snail). Cornu aspersum (garden snail) – another well-known helicid – was originally described as a member of Helix (as "Helix aspersa"), but the prevailing classification places it as the sole member of the sister genus Cornu.

Helix snails have been harvested for human consumption since prehistoric times. In the common era, members of the genus (particularly H. pomatia) are farmed throughout the world for the dish escargot, an hors d'oeuvre. The establishment of snail farms outside of Europe has introduced several species to North America, South America, and Africa, where some escapees have established themselves as invasive species.

Taxonomy

Some taxonomists remove the species "Helix aperta", "Helix aspersa", and "Helix mazzullii" from the genus Helix and place them in their own monotypic genera as Cantareus apertus, Cornu aspersum, and Cantareus mazzullii.

At the beginning in the mid-1700s, the generic name Helix had been used for almost all terrestrial gastropods; later this was restricted to species with helicoid habitus, including zonitids and other groups. In the course of the 1800s, more groups were removed, but prior to 1900, several thousand helicid and hygromiid species of Europe and abroad had still been classified in the genus Helix. By the early 1900s, the genus was split into many separate genera, leaving only some 30 species closely related to its type species Helix pomatia in the genus.

The genus Helix has many synonyms:
 Callunea Scudder, 1882
 Cochlea Da Costa, 1778
 Coenatoria Held, 1838
 Cunula Pallary, 1936
 Glischrus S. Studer, 1820
 Glischrus (Helix) Linnaeus, 1758
 Helicites W. Martin, 1809 (Established for fossils of Helix to distinguish them from extant members of that taxon. Invalid: available only for the purposes of the Principle of Homonymy (Art. 20))
 Helicogena A. Férussac, 1821
 Helix (Helix) Linnaeus, 1758· accepted, alternate representation
 Helix (Pelasga) P. Hesse, 1908· accepted, alternate representation
 Megastoma Scudder, 1882
 Naegelea P. Hesse, 1918
 Pachyphallus P. Hesse, 1918
 Pentataenia A. Schmidt, 1855 (junior objective synonym)
 Physospira C.R. Boettger, 1914
 Pomatia Beck, 1837
 Pomatiana Fagot, 1903
 Pomatiella Pallary, 1909
 Pseudofigulina P. Hesse, 1917
 Rhododerma P. Hesse, 1918
 Tacheopsis Boettger, 1909
 Tammouzia Pallary, 1939

Many species of Helix have been brought into synonymy:
 Helix achates Rossmässler, 1835: synonym of Chilostoma achates (Rossmässler, 1835)
 Helix afra Gmelin, 1791: synonym of Pedipes pedipes (Bruguière, 1789)
 Helix amarula Linnaeus, 1758: synonym of Thiara amarula (Linnaeus, 1758)
 Helix ambigua Linnaeus, 1758: synonym of Fossarus ambiguus (Linnaeus, 1758)
 Helix ampullacea Linnaeus, 1758: synonym of Pila ampullacea (Linnaeus, 1758)
 Helix aorangi Suter, 1890: synonym of Huonodon microundulatum (Suter, 1890)
 Helix auricularia Linnaeus, 1758: synonym of Radix auricularia (Linnaeus, 1758)
 Helix australis Férussac, 1821: synonym of Austrosuccinea australis (Férussac, 1821)
 Helix cingulata (Studer, 1820): synonym of Chilostoma cingulatum (Studer, 1820)
 Helix cingulata var. olympica Roth, 1855: synonym of Cattania olympica (Roth, 1855)
 Helix complanata Linnaeus, 1758: synonym of Hippeutis complanatus (Linnaeus, 1758)
 Helix contorta Linnaeus, 1758: synonym of Bathyomphalus contortus (Linnaeus, 1758)
 Helix corallina Chemnitz, 1795: synonym of Scalenostoma subulatum (Broderip, 1832)
 Helix coriacea Pallas, 1788: synonym of Velutina coriacea (Pallas, 1788)
 Helix cornuarietis Linnaeus, 1758: synonym of Marisa cornuarietis (Linnaeus, 1758)
 Helix corvus Gmelin, 1791: synonym of Corvusiana corvus (Gmelin, 1791)
 Helix crenata Gmelin, 1791: synonym of Amphibola crenata (Gmelin, 1791)
 Helix cyclostomoides Pfeiffer, 1840: synonym of Vitrinella cyclostomoides (Pfeiffer, 1840)
 Helix decussata Montagu, 1803: synonym of Rissoina decussata (Montagu, 1803)
 Helix depressa Montagu, 1803: synonym of Skeneopsis planorbis (O. Fabricius, 1780)
 Helix eburnea Mühlfeld, 1824: synonym of Melanella eburnea (Mühlfeld, 1824)
 Helix fasciata Adams J., 1800: synonym of Lacuna parva (da Costa, 1778)
 Helix fasciolata Spix in Wagner, 1827: synonym of Asolene crassa (Swainson, 1823)
 Helix flavocincta Mühlfeld, 1829: synonym of Eulima glabra (da Costa, 1778)
 Helix fossaria Montagu, 1803: synonym of Galba truncatula (O. F. Müller, 1774)
 Helix fragilis Linnaeus, 1758: synonym of Lymnaea fragilis (Linnaeus, 1758)
 Helix fulgidus Adams J., 1797: synonym of Eatonina fulgida (Adams J., 1797)
 Helix glabrata Megerle von Mühlfeld, 1824: synonym of Pisinna glabrata (Megerle von Mühlfeld, 1824)
 Helix glauca Linnaeus, 1758: synonym of Pomacea glauca (Linnaeus, 1758)
 Helix grenvillei Brazier, 1876: synonym of Thysanota grenvillei (Brazier, 1876)
 Helix haliotoidea Linnaeus, 1758: synonym of Sinum haliotoideum (Linnaeus, 1758)
 Helix janthina Linnaeus, 1758: synonym of Janthina janthina (Linnaeus, 1758)
 Helix janthina Linnaeus, 1764: synonym of Janthina prolongata Blainville, 1822: synonym of Janthina globosa Swainson, 1822
 Helix labiosa Montagu, 1803: synonym of Rissoa membranacea (J. Adams, 1800)
 Helix lacuna Montagu, 1803: synonym of Lacuna parva (da Costa, 1778)
 Helix laevigata Linnaeus, 1758: synonym of Velutina velutina (O. F. Müller, 1776)
 Helix littorina delle Chiaje, 1828: synonym of Paludinella littorina (delle Chiaje, 1828): synonym of Melarhaphe neritoides (Linnaeus, 1758)
 Helix macneili Crosse, 1873: synonym of Averellia macneili (Crosse, 1873)
 Helix margarita Montagu, 1808: synonym of Margarites helicinus (Phipps, 1774)
 Helix mespillum Mühlfeld, 1824: synonym of Echinolittorina mespillum (Mühlfeld, 1824)
 Helix neritina Gmelin, 1791: synonym of Pomacea glauca (Linnaeus, 1758)
 Helix neritoidea Linnaeus, 1758: synonym of Sinum neritoideum (Linnaeus, 1758)
 Helix neritoidea Gmelin, 1791: synonym of Lamellaria perspicua (Linnaeus, 1758)
 Helix nutans Mühlfeld, 1824: synonym of Melanella nutans (Mühlfeld, 1824)
 Helix oculuscommunis Gmelin, 1791: synonym of Pomacea glauca (Linnaeus, 1758)
 Helix otis Turton, 1819: synonym of Otina ovata (Brown, 1827)
 Helix paradoxa Born, 1778: synonym of Chrysostoma paradoxum (Born, 1778)
 Helix perspicua Linnaeus, 1758: synonym of Lamellaria perspicua (Linnaeus, 1758)
 Helix petraea Montagu, 1803: synonym of Melarhaphe neritoides (Linnaeus, 1758)
 Helix platae Maton, 1811: synonym of Asolene platae (Maton, 1811)
 Helix priamus Gmelin, 1791: synonym of Ampulla priamus (Gmelin, 1791)
 Helix purpurea Gmelin, 1791: synonym of Cantharidus purpureus (Gmelin, 1791)
 Helix rodriguezensis Crosse, 1873: synonym of Dancea rodriguezensis (Crosse, 1873)
 Helix scabra Linnaeus, 1758: synonym of Littoraria scabra (Linnaeus, 1758)
 Helix scarabaeus Linnaeus, 1758: synonym of Pythia scarabaeus (Linnaeus, 1758)
 Helix serpuloides Montagu, 1808: synonym of Skenea serpuloides (Montagu, 1808)
 Helix solida Born, 1778: synonym of Phasianella solida (Born, 1778)
 Helix stagnalis Linnaeus, 1758: synonym of Lymnaea stagnalis (Linnaeus, 1758)
 Helix stagnorum Gmelin, 1791: synonym of Heleobia stagnorum (Gmelin, 1791): synonym of Semisalsa stagnorum (Gmelin, 1791)
 Helix subcarinata Montagu, 1803: synonym of Tornus subcarinatus (Montagu, 1803)
 Helix subcylindrica Linnaeus, 1767: synonym of Truncatella subcylindrica (Linnaeus, 1767)
 Helix sulphurea C. B. Adams, 1849: synonym of Tonna pennata (Mörch, 1853)
 Helix tentaculata Linnaeus, 1758: synonym of Bithynia tentaculata (Linnaeus, 1758)
 Helix terebellum O. F. Müller, 1774: synonym of Pyramidella dolabrata (Linnaeus, 1758)
 Helix variabilis Megerle von Mühlfeld, 1824: synonym of Rissoa variabilis (Von Mühlfeldt, 1824)

Description 

In addition to the hard, calcareous shell that covers and protects the internal organs, the head and foot regions can be observed when the snails are fully extended. When they are active, the organs such as the lung, heart, kidney, and intestines remain inside the shell; only the head and foot emerge.

The head of the snail has two pairs of tentacles; the upper and larger pair contains the eyes, and the lower pair is used to feel the ground in front. The mouth is located just underneath the head. The tentacles can be withdrawn or extended depending on the situation. The mouth has a tongue called a "radula" that is composed of many fine, chitinous teeth. This serves for rasping and cutting food.

Behaviour
From April through the northern summer, the number of snails copulating increases due to the higher temperature and humidity, which enhance the possibility of oviposition. The pulmonate snails are hermaphroditic, meaning that both female and male sexual organs are present in the same individual. The snails produce both eggs and sperm in the ovotestis (also called the hermaphrodite gland), but it is later separated into two divisions, a sperm duct and oviduct, respectively.

Mating takes several hours, sometimes a day. H. aspersa snails stab a calcite spine, known as a "love dart", at their partner. The love dart is coated with a mucus that contains a chemical that enables more than twice as many sperm to survive inside the recipient. A few days after mating, the eggs are laid in the soil. The eggs are usually 4–6 mm in diameter.

After snails hatch from the egg, they mature in one or more years, depending on where the organism lives. Maturity takes two years in Southern California, while it takes only 10 months in South Africa.

The size of the adult snails slightly varies with species. H. aspersa grows up to 35 mm in height and width, whereas H. pomatia grows up to 45 mm. The lifespan of snails in the wild is typically 2-3 years.

Some snails may live longer, perhaps even 30 years or older in the case of the Roman snail but most live less than 8 years. Many deaths are due to predators and parasites.

Since its publication in March 1974 issue of Natural History an estimate for the highest speed of garden snail equal to 0.03 mph (1.3 cm/s) became popular. However, the accuracy of this estimate has been questioned by Robert Cameron, who pointed out that in competitions between snails, only 2.4 mm/s speed had been achieved. There is a need for clarification and behavioural observation here though: competitions are usually held on the flat, whereas a snail's natural preference is vertical ascent, possibly an instinct derived from hatching in an earth "pod" and having to climb upwards to the surface.

Respiration 

Since snails in the genus Helix are terrestrial rather than freshwater or marine, they have developed a simple lung for respiration. (Most other snails and gastropods have gills, instead.)

Oxygen is carried by the blood pigment hemocyanin. Both oxygen and carbon dioxide diffuse in and out of blood through the capillaries. A muscular valve regulates the process of opening and closing the entrance of the lung. When the valve opens, the air can either enter or leave the lung. The valve plays an important role in reducing water loss and preventing drowning.

Ecology 
Helix snails prefer cool, damp environments, as they easily suffer moisture loss. Snails are most active at night and after rainfall. During unfavourable conditions, a snail remains inside its shell, usually under rocks or other hiding places, to avoid being discovered by predators. In dry climates, snails naturally congregate near water sources, including artificial sources such as wastewater outlets of air conditioners.

The common garden snail (H.aspersa) is herbivorous. These snails are able to digest most vegetation, including carrots and lettuce. They also have a specialized crop of symbiotic bacteria that aid in their digestion, especially with the breakdown of the polysaccharide cellulose into simple sugars.

Many predators, both specialist and generalist, feed on snails. Some animals, such as the song thrush, break the shell of the snail by hammering it against a hard object, such as stone,  to expose its edible insides. Other predators, such as some species of frogs, circumvent the need to break snail shells by simply swallowing the snail whole, shell and all.

Some carnivorous species of snails, such as the decollate snail and the rosy wolf snail, also prey on Helix snails. Such carnivorous snails are commercially grown and sold to combat pest snail species. Many of these also escape into the wild, where they prey on indigenous snails, such as the Cuban land snails of the genus Polymita, and the indigenous snails of Hawaii.

Edible snails

H. pomatia and H. aspersa are the two edible species that are most used in European cuisine. Spanish cuisine also uses Otala punctata, Theba pisana, and Iberus gualterianus alonensis, amongst others. The process of snail farming is called heliciculture.

Escargots are often traditionally served as appetizers. They may also be used as ingredients in other recipes.

Snails contain many nutrients. They are rich in calcium and also contain vitamin B1 and E. They contain various essential amino acids, and are low in calories and fat.

List of Helix species

There are also 6 extinct species of Helix:
Helix barbeyana De Stefani in De Stefani et al., 1891
Helix divionensis J. Martin, 1866
Helix krejcii Wenz in Krejci-Graf & Wenz, 1926
Helix mrazeci Sevastos, 1922
Helix sublutescens Wenz in Krejci & Wenz, 1926

Taxon inquirendum
 
 
 Helix (Cochlichondra) Jan, 1830 
 Helix (Cochlogibba) Jan, 1830 
 Helix (Patera) Albers, 1850 (Invalid: junior homonym of Patera Lesson, 1839 [Cnidaria])
 Helix achilli Bourguignat, 1883 
 Helix acompsia (Bourguignat, 1863) 
 Helix adelaidae L. Pfeiffer, 1857 
 Helix adusta Hinds, 1845 
 Helix ahmedi Pallary, 1899 
 Helix aidae Pallary, 1899 
 Helix alata L. Pfeiffer, 1856 
 Helix albersi L. Pfeiffer, 1849 
 Helix albidens Benson, 1853 
 Helix alinae Pallary, 1899 
 Helix alsiella Pallary, 1899 
 Helix alveolus Heude, 1890 
 Helix annamitica Crosse & Fischer, 1863 
 Helix anomia Heude, 1890 
 Helix ansorinus Theobald, 1866 
 Helix appressa Say, 1821 
 Helix arabophila Pallary, 1898 
 Helix araneaetela Heude, 1885 
 Helix artificiosa Benson, 1856 
 Helix arundinetorum Heude, 1882 
 Helix avidorum Cox, 1868 
 Helix bahamensis L. Pfeiffer, 1845 
 Helix barclayana L. Pfeiffer, 1847 
 Helix barrakporensis Benson, 1859 
 Helix batchianensis L. Pfeiffer, 1861 
 Helix batesii L. Pfeiffer, 1860 
 Helix beccarii Jickeli, 1874 (taxon inquirendum, replacement name for Helix ciliata non Venetz)
 Helix belcheri L. Pfeiffer, 1846 
 Helix bicallosula Heude, 1886 
 Helix biconvexa Martens, 1864 
 Helix binneyana L. Pfeiffer, 1847 
 Helix bizona Gredler, 1884 
 Helix boissieri S. Moricand, 1846 
 Helix bombax Benson, 1859 
 Helix bonplandii Lamarck, 1822 
 Helix bourguignati L. Pfeiffer, 1857 
 Helix boxalli G. B. Sowerby III, 1888 (use in recent literature currently undocumented)
 Helix brocchii Jickeli, 1874 (invalid; not F. Sandberger, 1872)
 Helix brucei Jickeli, 1874 (use in recent literature currently undocumented)
 Helix bullina Férussac, 1832 (has also been mistakenly identified as Amphibulima rubescens Deshayes, 1830) 
 Helix buxina Heude, 1886 
 Helix caelatura Férussac, 1821 
 Helix calpis Benson, 1859 
 Helix calymma Schmacker & O. Boettger, 1894 
 Helix campelica Mabille, 1886 (taxon inquirendum, no documented use in recent literature)
 Helix capessens Benson, 1856 
 Helix carinata Link, 1807 
 Helix carmeliensis L. Pfeiffer, 1861 
 Helix carpalima J. Mabille, 1889 
 Helix cassidula Benson, 1859 
 Helix caucasica L. Pfeiffer, 1846 
 Helix ceryx Benson, 1859 
 Helix chadiana Pallary, 1899 
 Helix cherifiana Pallary, 1899 
 Helix chionodiscus L. Pfeiffer, 1857 
 Helix cimex Reeve, 1854 
 Helix coagulata L. Pfeiffer, 1856 
 Helix conrauxiana Heude, 1885 
 Helix conulus Martens, 1864 
 Helix corneola Clessin, 1874 
 Helix cumulus Reeve, 1854 
 Helix cyclostomopsis I. Lea, 1834 
 Helix cyclotrema Benson, 1863 
 Helix cypsele L. Pfeiffer, 1849 
 Helix cyrenaica E. von Martens, 1883 
 Helix debauxii Noulet, 1854 †
 Helix decidua L. Pfeiffer, 1857 
 Helix delavayana Heude, 1885 
 Helix demolita Heude, 1885 
 Helix depsta Cox, 1870 
 Helix dhericourtiana Bourguignat, 1885 
 Helix diaphana I. Lea, 1834 
 Helix diniensis Rambur, 1868 
 Helix doufourii Grateloup, 1840 
 Helix dubia Clessin, 1874 
 Helix ductilis Pfeiffer, 1857 
 Helix egregia Deshayes, 1850 
 Helix emmae Pallary, 1899 
 Helix exacta L. Pfeiffer, 1863 
 Helix exilis O. F. Müller, 1774 
 Helix expansa Clessin, 1874 
 Helix exserta L. Pfeiffer, 1856 
 Helix faradensis L. Pfeiffer, 1861 
 Helix fauna Philippi, 1851 
 Helix faunus Broderip, 1841 
 Helix ferretiana Bourguignat, 1883 
 Helix filaris L. Pfeiffer, 1845 
 Helix flammata Férussac, 1821 
 Helix flaveola Martens, 1864 
 Helix fornicata Gould, 1846 
 Helix forrestiana Angas, 1875 
 Helix fortunei Heude, 1882 
 Helix fossaria Montagu, 1803 
 Helix fritillata Benson, 1863 
 Helix galinieriana Bourguignat, 1883 
 Helix gaudiella Mabille, 1886 (taxon inquirendum, no documented use in recent literature)
 Helix gerlachi Möllendorff 
 Helix gigas L. Pfeiffer, 1850 
 Helix giraudeliana Heude, 1882 
 Helix globula I. Lea, 1834 
 Helix glomerosa Godwin-Austen, 1883 
 Helix gordoniae Benson, 1863 
 Helix graminum Heude, 1882 
 Helix griffithi L. Pfeiffer, 1846 
 Helix grossularia L. Pfeiffer, 1861 
 Helix guadalcanarensis Cox, 1872 
 Helix guinaria L. Pfeiffer, 1861 
 Helix haesitans Heude, 1888 
 Helix hamacenica Bourguignat, 1883 
 Helix hamudae Kobelt, 1886 (taxon inquirendum, use in recent literature currently undocumented)
 Helix helmii G. B. Sowerby I, 1838 (taxon inquirendum, use in recent literature currently undocumented)
 Helix herbini Bourguignat, 1883 
 Helix herpestes Heude, 1885 
 Helix herza J. Mabille, 1889 
 Helix hians L. Pfeiffer, 1846 
 Helix hongkongensis Deshayes, 1874 
 Helix horripilosella Heude, 1885 
 Helix huberiana Heude, 1882 
 Helix iae Pallary, 1899 
 Helix improvisa Heude, 1885 
 Helix ingloria Heude, 1890 
 Helix involuta L. Pfeiffer, 1845 
 Helix jacob Gredler, 1887 
 Helix keratina Heude, 1889 
 Helix kuangtunensis Gredler, 1881 
 Helix labiata L. Pfeiffer, 1845 
 Helix lamellata M. Bielz, 1851 
 Helix languescens Heude, 1890 
 Helix lariollei Pallary, 1899 
 Helix latrunculorum Heude, 1885 
 Helix lenticularis Morelet, 1853 
 Helix linnaeana L. Pfeiffer, 1845 
 Helix listeri Broderip, 1841 
 Helix loxodon L. Pfeiffer, 1850 
 Helix luctativa J. Mabille, 1889 
 Helix lutuosa Deshayes, 1874 
 Helix lyrata Gould, 1846 
 Helix madritensis Rambur, 1868 
 Helix mamilla 
 Helix marcida Benson, 1853 
 Helix margaritacea A. Schmidt, 1852 
 Helix melillensis Pallary, 1899 
 Helix mellita Heude, 1886 
 Helix mellitula Heude, 1886 
 Helix mendanae Cox, 1873 
 Helix mendicaria L. Pfeiffer, 1860 
 Helix mensalis Heude, 1888 
 Helix meretrix G. B. Sowerby I, 1841 (taxon inquirendum, use in recent literature currently undocumented)
 Helix meridionalis Mousson, 1854 (taxon inquirendum, non Wood, 1828)
 Helix mersispira Martens, 1864 
 Helix mesquiniana Pallary, 1898 
 Helix micacea Heude, 1882 
 Helix microzaffarina Pallary, 1898 
 Helix mighelsiana L. Pfeiffer, 1847 
 Helix miliaria Gredler, 1881 
 Helix mimicula Heude, 1888 
 Helix minutella J. Mabille, 1889 
 Helix monodonta I. Lea, 1834 
 Helix moquiniana Raymond, 1853 
 Helix moretonensis Reeve, 1854 
 Helix muscarum I. Lea, 1834 
 Helix mystagoga J. Mabille, 1888 
 Helix nautarum Heude, 1882 
 Helix nicolai Klećak, 1880 (taxon inquirendum, use in more recent taxonomic literature currently undocumented)
 Helix novare L. Pfeiffer, 1861 
 Helix nystiana L. Pfeiffer, 1846 
 Helix oberndoerferi Kobelt, 1882 (taxon inquirendum, use in more recent taxonomic literature currently undocumented)
 Helix obscura Deshayes, 1874 
 Helix oleosa L. Pfeiffer, 1850 
 Helix omissa L. Pfeiffer, 1856 
 Helix onisterella J. Mabille, 1889 
 Helix opaca Gmelin, 1791 
 Helix ophelia Reeve, 1854 
 Helix ovumreguli I. Lea, 1834 
 Helix pansa Benson, 1856 
 Helix pantheia J. Mabille, 1888 
 Helix papillata L. Pfeiffer, 1846 
 Helix papillionacea Valenciennes, 1827 
 Helix papyracea Broderip, 1841 
 Helix paraeruginosa Heude, 1888 
 Helix parasitarum Heude, 1885 
 Helix parasitica Heude, 1885 
 Helix paropta Mabille, 1886 (taxon inquirendum, no documented use in recent literature)
 Helix paulinae Pallary, 1899 
 Helix peguensis Benson, 1860 
 Helix pemphigodes L. Pfeiffer, 1847 
 Helix pena Cox, 1868 
 Helix penicillata Gould, 1842 
 Helix pennantiana L. Pfeiffer, 1845 
 Helix perforata Deshayes, 1874 
 Helix permellita Heude, 1890 
 Helix phragmitum Heude, 1882 
 Helix phyllophaga Heude, 1882 
 Helix pilidion Benson, 1860 
 Helix pilifera E. von Martens, 1869 
 Helix piligera Gredler, 1885 
 Helix plicatilis Deshayes, 1870 
 Helix pliculosa L. Pfeiffer, 1857 
 Helix portoricensis L. Pfeiffer, 1847 
 Helix praelongata Pallary, 1898 
 Helix praeruginosa Heude, 1888 
 Helix probata Mabille, 1898 
 Helix prshewalskii Martens, 1881 
 Helix prunum Férussac, 1821 
 Helix puberosula Heude, 1885 
 Helix purpuragula I. Lea, 1834 
 Helix puteolus Benson, 1853 
 Helix pyantha J. Mabille, 1889 
 Helix pyramidalis G. B. Sowerby I, 1841 (taxon inquirendum, use in recent literature currently undocumented)
 Helix pyxis Hinds, 1845 
 Helix quedenfeldti E. von Martens, 1890 
 Helix quirosi Cox, 1873 
 Helix radicicola Benson, 1859 
 Helix radulella Heude, 1885 
 Helix radulina Heude, 1888 
 Helix rebellis Heude, 1885 
 Helix reginae W. J. Broderip, 1841 
 Helix renaltiana Heude, 1889 
 Helix rerayana Pallary, 1899 
 Helix rissoana L. Pfeiffer, 1847 
 Helix rosacea G. B. Sowerby I, 1839 (taxon inquirendum, Invalid: junior homonym of Helix rosacea O. F. Müller, 1774)
 Helix rostrata L. Pfeiffer, 1847 
 Helix rupelli Deshayes, 1870 
 Helix samara Heude, 1886 
 Helix samarella Heude, 1888 
 Helix sanata Heude, 1889 
 Helix sansitus Cox, 1870 
 Helix saturnia Gould, 1846 
 Helix savignyana Ehrenberg, 1831 
 Helix saxatilis Gould, 1846 (taxon inquirendum, not Hartmann, 1821)
 Helix scenoma Benson, 1863 
 Helix schweinfurthi E. von Martens, 1877 
 Helix secundaria Heude, 1890 
 Helix sedentaria Heude, 1885 
 Helix seguiniana Heude, 1885 
 Helix semicarinata Ancey, 1881 
 Helix semifusca Deshayes, 1832 
 Helix semigranosa G. B. Sowerby I, 1841 (taxon inquirendum, use in recent literature currently undocumented)
 Helix semirugosa Pallary, 1899 
 Helix sempriniana Heude, 1882 
 Helix sireti Pallary, 1898 
 Helix sororia Cox, 1870 
 Helix specialis Bourguignat, 1881 
 Helix spengleriana L. Pfeiffer, 1847 
 Helix spirillus Gould, 1852 
 Helix squalus Hinds, 1845 
 Helix squamosella Heude, 1882 
 Helix squamulosa Mousson, 1856 
 Helix stauropolitana A. Schmidt, 1855 
 Helix strucki Maltzan, 1886 (taxon inquirendum, use in recent literature currently undocumented)
 Helix subcinctula Heude, 1890 
 Helix subechinata Deshayes, 1870 
 Helix subgranosa Le Guillou, 1842 
 Helix subgriseola Heude, 1888 
 Helix sublallementiana Pallary, 1899 
 Helix subnivellina Bourguignat, 1883 
 Helix subnuda J. Mabille, 1889 
 Helix subparasitica Heude, 1888 
 Helix suffulta Benson, 1853 
 Helix sumatrana Martens, 1864 
 Helix supracostata Kobelt, 1882 (taxon inquirendum, use in recent literature currently undocumented)
 Helix taliensis Heude, 1890 
 Helix talifouensis Heude, 1888 
 Helix tarifensis Bourguignat in Servain, 1881 
 Helix tarnieri Pallary, 1899 
 Helix tenuis L. Pfeiffer, 1845 
 Helix terrestris Forskål, 1775 
 Helix tescorum Benson, 1853 
 Helix theobryta J. Mabille, 1889 
 Helix thibetica Deshayes, 1870 
 Helix tickelli Theobald, 1859 
 Helix tristrami L. Pfeiffer, 1860 
 Helix tumida L. Pfeiffer, 1846 
 Helix turbinella Heude, 1890 
 Helix tutuillae Cox, 1870 
 Helix vannaelaeve Cox, 1870 
 Helix variolosa L. Pfeiffer, 1846 
 Helix vatheleti J. Mabille, 1888 
 Helix vesica I. Lea, 1834 
 Helix vesica L. Pfeiffer, 1842 (taxon inquirendum, not Helix vesica I. Lea, 1834)
 Helix vicinella Heude, 1890 
 Helix vitiensis L. Pfeiffer, 1855 
 Helix vitreola Heude, 1890 
 Helix vivacula J. Mabille, 1889 
 Helix vorticellina Heude, 1889 
 Helix wanganensis Cox, 1870 
 Helix welschi Pallary, 1899 
 Helix woodiana I. Lea, 1834 
 Helix yentaiensis Crosse & Debeaux 
 Helix yorkensis Reeve, 1854 
 Helix zelina Cox, 1873 
 Helix zeus L. Pfeiffer, 1843 
 Helix zollingeri L. Pfeiffer, 1854 
 Helix zonites L. Pfeiffer, 1846 
 Helix zorica J. Mabille, 1889 
 Helix zoroaster Theobald, 1859

Nomen dubium
 Helix calomorpha Jonas, 1839 
 Helix cornea Draparnaud, 1801 
 Helix laevigata Linnaeus, 1767 accepted as Velutina laevigata (Linnaeus, 1767) (nomen dubium, original combination)
 Helix minutialis Deshayes, 1851 
 Helix multispirata Hombron & Jacquinot, 1852 
 Helix oceanica Le Guillou, 1842 
 Helix rotula Hombron & Jacquinot, 1852 (nomen dubium, invalid: junior homonym of Helix rotula Lowe, 1831; no replacement name available)
 Helix rugosa L. Pfeiffer, 1843 
 Helix undulata Gmelin, 1791 
 Helix unispiralis Montagu, 1803

Nomen nudum
Subgenus Helix (Pitys) H. Beck, 1837 
 Helix (Pitys) oparana H. Beck, 1837 
 Helix angulata Férussac, 1821 
 Helix congellana Krauss in E. von Martens, 1860 
 Helix exoptata Tate, 1882 
 Helix globula Krynicki, 1838 
 Helix ingrami Blanford, 1876 
 Helix roseri F. Krauss in E. von Martens, 1860 
 Helix roseri Krauss in E. von Martens, 1860 
 Helix somersetii Prime, 1853 
 Helix tingitana Beck, 1837

References

 
Helicidae
Gastropod genera
Extant Oligocene first appearances